Cold Feet is a UK comedy-drama television series.

Cold Feet may also refer to:

Cold feet, apprehension or doubt strong enough to prevent a planned course of action
Project COLDFEET, a CIA operation in 1962
Cold Feet (American TV series), the US version of the UK series
Cold Feet (1922 film), a comedy short film directed by Al Christie
Cold Feet (1983 film), a comedy film starring Griffin Dunne
Cold Feet (1989 film), a comedy film starring Keith Carradine
Cold Feet (1999 film), a drama film starring Chenoa Maxwell
"Cold Feet!", a 1990 [[List of The Raccoons episodes#Season 5 (1990-1991)|episode of The Raccoons]]
"Cold Feet", a song by Tracy Chapman from New Beginning''
 "Cold Feet", a 2020 song by Loud Luxury

See also
 Chilblain
 Immersion foot, aka trench foot
 Frostbite
 Hypothyroidism
 Peripheral neuropathy
 Peripheral artery occlusive disease, aka peripheral vascular disease
 Raynaud's phenomenon
 Raynaud's disease